Seaboard Railroad may refer to:
Seaboard Air Line Railroad
Seaboard Coast Line Railroad
Seaboard System Railroad